This is a list of paintings produced by members of the Pre-Raphaelite Brotherhood and other artists associated with the Pre-Raphaelite style. The term "Pre-Raphaelite" is used here in a loose and inclusive fashion.

PRB members

James Collinson

The Renunciation of St. Elizabeth of Hungary (1850)
Answering the Emigrant's Letter (1850)
A Son of the Soil (1856)
Home Again (1856)
To Let, also known as The Landlady (1856)
For Sale, also known as At the Bazaar (1857)
The Sisters (c. 1860)
Too Hot (1863) 
The Holy Family (1878)

William Holman Hunt

Self-portrait at the Age of 14 (1841), Ashmolean Museum, Oxford
Love at First Sight (1846)
F. G. Stephens (1847), Tate Britain, London
Christ and the Two Marys aka The Risen Christ with the Two Marys in the Garden of Joseph of Aramathea (1847 and 1897), Art Gallery of South Australia, Adelaide
The Escape of Madeline and Porphyro during the drunkenness attending the revelry (The Eve of St. Agnes) (1848), Guildhall Art Gallery, London
Rienzi vowing to obtain justice for the death of his young brother, slain in a skirmish between the Colonna and the Orsini factions (1848–49), collection of Mrs. E. M. Clarke
The Haunted Manor (1849), Tate Britain, London
Cornfield at Ewell (1849), Tate Britain, London
A Converted British Family Sheltering a Christian Missionary from the Persecution of the Druids (1849–50), Ashmolean Museum, Oxford
Claudio and Isabella (1850–1853), Tate Britain, London
The Hireling Shepherd (1851), Manchester Art Gallery
The Awakening Conscience (1851–1853), Tate Britain, London
Our English Coasts (1852), Tate Britain, London
Dante Gabriel Rossetti (1853), Birmingham Museum and Art Gallery
The Light of the World (1853–54), Keble College, Oxford
The Great Pyramid (1854)
The Finding of the Saviour in the Temple (1854–1860), Birmingham Museum & Art Gallery
The Afterglow in Egypt (1854–63), Ashmolean Museum, Oxford
The Scapegoat (1854–1856), Lady Lever Art Gallery, Port Sunlight
The School-girl's Hymn (1858–59), Ashmolean Museum, Oxford
London Bridge on the Night of the Marriage of the Prince and Princess of Wales (1863–64), Ashmolean Museum, Oxford
The Festival of St. Swithin (The Dovecot) (1865–66), Ashmolean Museum, Oxford
Il Dolce Far Niente (1866), Forbes Magazine Collection
Isabella and the Pot of Basil (1868), Laing Art Gallery, Newcastle upon Tyne
The Shadow of Death (1870–1873), Manchester Art Gallery
The Ship (1875)
The Plain of Esdralon from the Heights above Nazareth (1877), Ashmolean Museum, Oxford
Sunset at Chimalditi
The Triumph of the Innocents (1883–84), Tate Britain, London
The Bride of Bethlehem (1884–85)
The Lady of Shalott (with Edward Robert Hughes) (1886–1905), Ella Gallup Sumner and Mary Catlin Sumner Collection, Wadsworth Atheneum, Connecticut
May Morning on Magdalen Tower (1888–1891), Lady Lever Art Gallery, Port Sunlight
The Nile Postman (1892)
The School of Nature (1893), Ponce Museum of Art, Puerto Rico
Christ the Pilot (ca. 1894)
The Importunate Neighbour (1895)
The Miracle of the Holy Fire (1892–1899), Fogg Art Museum, Harvard University
The Beloved (1898)
The Light of the World (with Edward Robert Hughes) (1900–1904), St Paul's Cathedral, London
John Hunt, Tate Britain, London
John Key, Tate Britain, London
Amaryllis
Bianca
Master Hilary – The Tracer
The King of Hearts
The Tuscan Straw Plaiter
The Apple Harvest – Valley of the Rhone
Athens
Nazareth
H. B. Martineau
Henry Wentworth Monk
Thomas Fairbairn
Sir Richard Owen
Harold Rathbone
Mrs. George Waugh
Emily Waugh Hunt
Fanny Waugh Hunt
William Holman Hunt
Christ amongst the Doctors
Isabella

John Everett Millais

Cymon and Iphigenia (1847–48), Lady Lever Art Gallery, Liverpool
The Death of Romeo and Juliet (c.1848), Manchester Art Gallery
Isabella (1848–49), Walker Art Gallery, Liverpool
Ferdinand Lured by Ariel (1850), Sudley House, Liverpool
Christ In The House Of His Parents (1850), Tate Britain, London
The Return of the Dove to the Ark (1851), Ashmolean Museum, Oxford
Mrs. Coventry Patmore (1851) Fitzwilliam Museum, Cambridge
A Huguenot (1852), Makins Collection (private)
Ophelia (1852), Tate Britain, London
The Proscribed Royalist, 1651 (1853), Andrew Lloyd Webber Collection
The Order of Release (1853), Tate Britain, London
Portrait of Annie Miller (1854), private collection
The Violet's Message (1854), private collection
Wandering Thoughts (1855), Manchester Art Gallery
The Rescue (1855), National Gallery of Victoria, Melbourne
Peace Concluded (1856), Minneapolis Institute of Arts
Autumn Leaves (1856), Manchester Art Gallery
The Blind Girl (1856), Birmingham Museum and Art Gallery
L'Enfant du Regiment (1856), Yale Center for British Art, Connecticut
A Dream of the Past: Sir Isumbras at the Ford (1857)
The Escape of a Heretic (1857), Museo de Arte de Ponce, Puerto Rico
Only a Lock of Hair (1857–58), Manchester Art Gallery
Spring (Apple Blossoms) (1859), Lady Lever Art Gallery, Liverpool
The Vale of Rest (1859), Tate Britain, London
The Black Brunswicker (1860), Lady Lever Art Gallery, Liverpool
The Ransom (1862), Getty Museum
The Eve of St. Agnes (1863), Royal Collection at Clarence House, London
Esther (1865), private collection
Vanessa (1868), Sudley House, Liverpool
Stella (1868), Manchester City Art Gallery
The Boyhood of Raleigh (1870), Tate Gallery, London
A Flood (1870), Manchester City Art Gallery
Martyr of Solway (1871), Walker Art Gallery, Liverpool
The Somnambulist (1871), Bolton Museum and Archive Services, Bolton, Greater Manchester 
Victory O Lord! (1871), Manchester City Art Gallery
Winter Fuel (1873), Manchester City Art Gallery
The North-West Passage (1874), Tate Gallery, London
Mrs Leopold Reiss (1876), Manchester City Art Gallery
The Two Princes Edward and Richard in the Tower (1876), Royal Holloway Collection, University of London, Egham
Chill October (1879), The Artchive
James Fraser (1880), Manchester City Art Gallery
An Idyll of 1745 (1884), Lady Lever Art Gallery, Liverpool
Bubbles (1886), owned by Unilever, on display at Lady Lever Art Gallery, Liverpool
The Nest (1887), Lady Lever Art Gallery, Liverpool
Dew-Drenched Furze (1890), private collection
Lingering Autumn (1890), Lady Lever Art Gallery, Liverpool
Glen Birnam (1891), Manchester City Art Gallery

Dante Gabriel Rossetti

Ecce Ancilla Domini or The Annunciation (1850), Tate Britain, London
Found (1854), Delaware Art Museum, Wilmington
Paolo and Francesca da Rimini (1855), Tate Britain, London
Dante's Dream at the Time of the Death of Beatrice (1856), Tate Britain, London
Bocca Baciata (1860), Museum of Fine Arts, Boston
Beata Beatrix (1864), Tate Britain, London
Venus Verticordia (1864–1868), Russell-Cotes Art Gallery & Museum, Bournemouth
The Beloved or The Bride or The King's Daughter (1865–66, 1873), Tate Britain, London
Monna Vanna or Belcolore (1866), Tate Britain, London 
Sibylla Palmifera or Venus Palmifera (1866–1870), Lady Lever Art Gallery, Port Sunlight
Lady Lilith (1867), Metropolitan Museum of Art, New York
Lady Lilith (1868), Delaware Art Museum, Wilmington
Pia de' Tolomei (c.1868), Spencer Museum of Art, Kansas
Silence (1870), Brooklyn Museum of Art, New York
Dante's Dream at the Time of the Death of Beatrice (1869–1871), Walker Art Gallery, Liverpool
Water Willow (1871), Delaware Art Museum, Wilmington
The Bower Meadow (1872), Manchester Art Gallery.
Veronica Veronese (1872), Delaware Art Museum, Wilmington
La Ghirlandata (1873), Guildhall Art Gallery, London
Proserpine (1874), Tate Britain, London.
Damsel of the Sanct Grael (1874), collection of Andrew Lloyd Webber
Roman Widow or Dîs Manibus (1874), Museo de Arte de Ponce, Puerto Rico
La Bella Mano (1875), Delaware Art Museum, Wilmington
Astarte Syriaca or Venus Astarte (1876–77), Manchester Art Gallery 
Mnemosyne or Lamp of Memory or Ricordanza (1876–1881), Delaware Art Museum, Wilmington
A Sea–Spell (1877), Fogg Museum of Art, Harvard University
A Vision of Fiammetta (1878), collection of Lord Lloyd-Webber
The Day Dream or Monna Primavera (1880), Victoria and Albert Museum, London
The Blessed Damozel (1875–1881), Lady Lever Art Gallery, Port Sunlight
Proserpine (1882), Birmingham Museums & Art Gallery, Birmingham

Other major artists

Lawrence Alma-Tadema

Ford Madox Brown

Manfred on the Jungfrau (1840–1861), Manchester Art Gallery
Take your Son, Sir! (1851–1892, unfinished), Tate Britain, London
Work (1852–1865), finished painting (1865) Manchester Art Gallery; full study (1863) in Birmingham Museum & Art Gallery 
The Last of England (1855), Birmingham Museum & Art Gallery; further oil version (1860) in the Fitzwilliam Museum, Cambridge; watercolour (1864–65) in Tate Britain, London
Stages of Cruelty (1856–1890), Manchester Art Gallery; 1856 watercolour sketch in Tate Britain, London
Cromwell on his Farm (1873–74), Lady Lever Art Gallery, Liverpool
Cromwell, Protector of the Vaudois (1877), Manchester Art Gallery

Edward Burne-Jones

The Merciful Knight (1863), Birmingham Museum & Art Gallery, Birmingham
The Beguiling of Merlin (1872–1877), Lady Lever Art Gallery, Port Sunlight
The Golden Stairs (1880), Tate Britain, London
The Last Sleep of Arthur in Avalon (1881), Museo de Arte de Ponce, Puerto Rico
The Mill (1882), Victoria and Albert Museum, London
Georgiana Burne-Jones (1883), private collection (?)
King Cophetua and the Beggar Maid (painting) (1884), Tate Britain, London
The Garden of Pan (c.1886), National Gallery of Victoria, Melbourne
The Star of Bethlehem (1887–1891), Birmingham Museum & Art Gallery, Birmingham
The Nativity (1888), Carnegie Museum of Art, Pittsburgh
Sponsa de Libano or The Bride of Lebanon (1891), Walker Art Gallery, Liverpool
Hope (1896), Museum of Fine Arts, Boston

Arthur Hughes

Ophelia (1851–1853)
April Love (1855–56), Tate Britain, London
Home From the Sea (1856–57)
The Long Engagement (1859), Birmingham Museum and Art Gallery 
Mariana at the window (c.1860s)
Knight of the Sun (circa 1861)
Home from Sea (1862), Ashmolean Museum, Oxford
La Belle Dame Sans Merci (1861–1863)
Ophelia and He Will Not Come Again (1863–64)
The Lady of Shalott (c.1863)
Beauty and the Beast (1863–1865)
A Music Party (1864)
In the Grass (c.1864–65), Sheffield Galleries and Museums Trust 
Good Night (1865–66)
Sir Galahad (1870), Walker Art Gallery, Liverpool
Endymion (1868–1870)
The Enchantress (circa 1870–1874)
The Lady of Shalott (c.1872–73)
The Convent Boat (1874)
A Christmas Carol at Bracken Dene (1878–79)
The Property Room (1879)
The Heavenly Stair (circa 1887–88)
Sir Galahad (circa 1894)
The Rescue (1907–08)
Overthrowing of the Rusty Knight (circa 1908)
Wonderland (1912)
Picking up seaweed
Returning Home
The King's Orchard
Will o' the Wisp

Sir Edward John Poynter

Associated artists

George Price Boyce

Crypt of St. Nicolas Giornico, Canton Ticino Switzerland (1856)
Outside the church of San Nicolo da Mira, Giornico (1856)
On the East Lynn, Middleham, North Devon (1858)
Streatley Mill at Sunset (1859)
From the Garden of Sherford Cottage, Bromyard (c.1860)
Autumn in the Welsh Hills (1860), Berger Collection Educational Trust, Denver Art Museum
Pyramids and Sphinx of Ghizeh (1861)
The Nile at Gizeh (1861)
At Binsey, near Oxford (1862), Cecil Higgins Art Gallery, Bedford
Newcastle from the Rabbit Banks, Gateshead on Tyne (1864)
Sandpit near Abinger, Surrey (1866–67), Walker Art Gallery, London
Abinger Mill-Pond, Surrey - Morning in Late Autumn (1866–67)
Study of Ellen Smith, head & shoulders (c.1868)
Pensosa d'Altrui (1869)
The Royal Oak, Bettws-y-Coed
Beeches
Timber Yard, Chiddingstone
East-end of Edward Confessor's Chapel, Westminster

John Brett

Emily, Mrs. Coventry Patmore (pre 1856) Ashmolean Museum, Oxford. portraying Emily Augusta Patmore.
The Glacier of Rosenlaui (1856), Tate Britain, London
The Stonebreaker (1857–58), Walker Art Gallery, Liverpool
Val d'Aosta (1858)
Florence from Bellosguardo (1863), Tate Britain, London
Lady with a Dove: Madame Loeser (1864), Tate Britain, London
Bonchurch Downs (1865), Metropolitan Museum of Art, New York
The British Channel Seen from the Dorsetshire Cliffs (1871), Tate Britain, London
Rocks: Scilly (1873), Walker Art Gallery, Liverpool
Britannia's Realm (1880), Tate Britain, London
From the Balcony, Cliff Cottage, Lee (1896)
Trevose Head (1897), Walker Art Gallery, Liverpool

James Campbell

The Lollipop (1855), Tate Britain, London
Girl with Jug of Ale and Pipes (1856), Walker Art Gallery, Liverpool
The Dragon's Den (1854), Walker Art Gallery, Liverpool
Waiting for Legal Advice (1857), Walker Art Gallery, Liverpool
The Wife's Remonstrance (1857–58), Birmingham Museum & Art Gallery
Our Village Clockmaker Solving a Problem (1859)
News from My Lad (1859), Walker Art Gallery, Liverpool
Twilight - Trudging Homewards
Home and Rest

John Collier

The Artist's Wife (1880)
Last Voyage of Henry Hudson (1881), Tate Britain, London
Clytemnestra after the Murder (1882), Guildhall Art Gallery, London 
 The Pharaoh's Handmaidens (1883), private collection
The Priestess of Bacchus (1885–1889)
Lilith (1887), Atkinson Art Gallery and Library, Southport
The Water Baby (1890)
Horace and Lydia (1890)
Priestess of Delphi (1891), Art Gallery of South Australia, Adelaide, Australia
In the Forest of Arden (1892)
Lady Hallé (1895)
The Laboratory (1895), private collection
The Death of Albine (1895)
Pope Urban VI (1896)
Lady Godiva (c. 1898), Herbert Art Gallery & Museum, Coventry
Queen Guinevre's Maying (1900), Cartwright Hall, Bradford
In the Venusberg (1901), version on canvas at the Atkinson Art Gallery and Library, Southport; version on board in a private collection
The Plague (1902)
The Prodigal Daughter (1903)
The Sinner (1904), Victoria Art Gallery, Bath 
Sentence of Death (1908)
The Land Baby (1909)
The White Devil (1909)
Mrs Campbell McInnes (1914), National Gallery of Victoria, Melbourne, Australia 
The Grand Lady (1920)
The Water Nymph (1923)
Mrs Huxley (1927–28), Tate Britain, London
Portrait of the Artist's Daughter (1929)
Shopping for Silks
Sleeping Beauty
Spring
Ellen Terry
Hetty Sorrell
The Death of Cleopatra, Gallery Oldham
The Brotherhood of Man, Potteries Museum & Art Gallery, Stoke-on-Trent
Reclining Woman, private collection

Charles Allston Collins

Berengaria's Alarm (1850)
Convent Thoughts (1851)
May, in the Regent's Park (1851)
The Devout Childhood of St Elizabeth of Hungary

Frank Cadogan Cowper

Rapunzel (1900)
Hamlet - The churchyard scene (1902)
Francis of Assisi and the Heavenly Melody (1904)
St Agnes in Prison Receiving from Heaven the Shining White Garment (1905)
La Belle Dame Sans Merci (1905)
Molly, Duchess of Nona (1905)
Mariana in the South (1906)
Vanity (1907)
How the Devil, Disguised (1907)
Erasmus and Thomas More Visit the Children of Henry VII at Greenwich (1908)
Lucretia Borgia Reigns in the Vatican in the Absence of Pope Alexander VI (1908–14)
Venetian Ladies Listening to the Serenade (1909)
The Love Letter (1911)
The Hon. Mrs. Hanbury-Tracy (1914)
Our Lady of the Fruits of the Earth (1917)
The Blue Bird (1918)
The Cathedral Scene from 'Faust': Margaret tormented by the Evil Spirit (1919)
Vanity (1919)
Fair Rosamund and Eleanor (1920)
The Damsel of the Lake (1924)
La Belle Dame Sans Merci (1926)
Titania Sleeps (1928)
Sir Havilland De Sausmarez (1930)
Mrs. Albert S. Kerry (1930)
Pamela, Daughter of Lieut. Col. M. F. Halford (1930)
La Belle Dame Sans Merci (1946)
The Ugly Duckling (1950)
The Legend of Sir Perceval (1952–53)
The Four Queens Find Lancelot Sleeping (1954)
Elizabeth, Daughter of Major General F V B Willis (1955)
The Golden Bowl (1956)
Self-Portrait (1957)
The Patient Griselda
Portrait of Professor Rey
Lancelot Slays the Caitiff Knight Sir Tarquin
Eve

William Davis

Bidston Marsh at Wallasey (1853)
Shotwick Church, Cheshire (1855)
Early Spring Evening, Cheshire (1855)
A Dark Roan Bull (1859)
Hale, Lancashire (c.1860), Walker Art Gallery, Liverpool
View from Bidston Hill (c.1865), Walker Art Gallery, Liverpool
A Day's Sport at Bidston Hill (c.1865), Tate Britain, London
Carving His Name
A Field of Corn
Wallasey Mill, Cheshire

Walter Howell Deverell

A Pet (1853)
The Grey Parrot (1852–53)
The Mock Marriage of Orlando and Rosalind (1853)
Twelfth Night, Act II, Scene IV (1850)

Frank Bernard Dicksee

Elopement (1872)
Harmony (1877)
Miranda (1878)
The Symbol (1881)
The Foolish Virgins (1883)
Spring Maiden (1884)
Romeo and Juliet (1884)
Chivalry (1885)
Hesperia (1887)
Portrait of a Woman (1887)
Beatrice (1888)
The Crisis (1891)
Startled (1892)
Leila (1892)
Passion (1892)
Funeral of a Viking (1893)
Paolo and Francesca (1894)
The Magic Crystal (1894)
The Mirror (1896)
The Confession (1896)
Dawn (1897)
An Offering (1898)
Portrait of a Lady (c.1900)
The Two Crowns (1900)
Yseult (1901)
La Belle Dame Sans Merci (1903)
The Mother (1907)
Flowers of June (1909)
The Shadowed Face (1909)
Portrait of Maude Moore (1913)
Camille, Daughter of Sutton Palmer, Esq (1914)
Dorothy (1917)
Portrait of Agnes Mallam (Mrs Edward Foster) (1921)
The End of the Quest (1921)
Mrs. Norman Holbrook (1924)
Portrait of Elsa (1927)
Sylvia
Portrait of Dora
Resurgam
Reverie
The Duet
The Emblem
The Reverie
Cleopatra

William Gale 

 Entry of Christ into Jerusalem

John William Godward

Thomas Cooper Gotch

Edward Robert Hughes

John William Inchbold

John Lee

Going to Market (1860), Walker Art Gallery, Liverpool
Sweethearts and Wives (1860), Walker Art Gallery, Liverpool

Edmund Leighton

Frederic Leighton

Evelyn De Morgan

Joseph Noel Paton

The Quarrel of Oberon and Titania (1849)
The Reconciliation of Oberon and Titania (1847)
The Pursuit of Pleasure (1855)
The Bluidie Tryst (1855)
Hesperus (1857)
In Memoriam (1858)
Oskold and the Ell-maids (1874)
In Die Malo (1882)
How an Angel rowed Sir Galahad across the Dern Mere (1888)
Oberon and the Mermaid (1888)
Warriors
Sir Galahad
Lux in Tenebris (1879)

Frederick Sandys
(Anthony Frederick Augustus Sandys)

Mrs Sandys, the artist's mother (late 1840s), Fitzwilliam Museum, Cambridge
Self-Portrait in a broad-brimmed Hat (1848), private collection
Study of Miss Sandys (1849), private collection
Portrait of a Young Man (before 1850), Fitzwilliam Museum, Cambridge
Emma Sandys, the artist's sister (1853–1855), Fitzwilliam Museum, Cambridge
Queen Eleanor (1858), National Museum of Wales
Mary Magdalene (1858–1860), Delaware Art Museum, Wilmington; listed at Bridgeman Art Library
Portrait of Adelaide Mary, Mrs Philip Bedingfeld (1859), Norwich Castle Museum and Art Gallery
Portrait of Mrs Clabburn (1860), Norwich Castle Museum and Art Gallery
Autumn (1860–1862), Norwich Castle Museum and Art Gallery
Oriana (1861), Tate Britain, London
King Pelles' Daughter bearing the Sancgraal (1861), private collection
Mary Magdalene (1862), Norwich Castle Museum and Art Gallery
La Belle Isolde (1862), private collection
Mrs. Susanna Rose (1862), Cleveland Museum of Art
Viven (1863), Manchester Art Gallery
Morgan le Fay (1864), Birmingham Museum & Art Gallery
Portrait of Jane Lewis, born 19 January 1793 (1864), private collection
Gentle Spring (1865), Ashmolean Museum, Oxford
Perdita (1866), private collection
Grace Rose (1866), Yale Center for British Art
Helen of Troy (1867), Walker Art Gallery, Liverpool
Love's Shadow (1867), private collection
Medea (1868), Birmingham Museum & Art Gallery
Miranda (1868), private collection
Valkyrie (1868–1873)
The Coral Necklace (1871), Cleveland Museum of Art
Cassandra, private collection
Portrait of a woman with red hair, private collection
Darby, a Yorkshire Terrier, private collection
Berenice, Queen of Egypt, Leighton House Museum, London
Portrait of Philip Bedingfeld LL.D, JP (undated), Norwich Castle Museum and Art Gallery

Thomas Seddon

In the Desert (1854), private collection
The Mountains of Moab (1854), Tate Britain, London
Jerusalem and the Valley of Jehoshaphat from the Hill of Evil Counsel (1854–55), Tate Britain, London
View on the Nile (1855), Tate Britain, London
Pyramids at Gizeh (1855), private collection
Mount Zion, private collection
The Citadel of Cairo, private collection

Simeon Solomon

I am starving (1857), National Gallery of Art, Washington D.C., USA
Self Portrait (1859)
Love in Autumn (1860)
Moses (1860)
The Painter's Pleasaunce (1861)
Meschach and Abednego preserved from the Burning Fiery Furnace (1863)
Priestess offering Poppies (1864)
In the Temple of Venus (1863)
Damon and Aglae (1866)
Love in Autumn (1866)
Bacchus (1867)
Carrying the Scrolls of the Law (1867)
Bacchus (1868)
Pastoral Lovers (1869)
The Toilet of a Roman Lady (1869), Delaware Art Museum, Wilmington, USA
The Sleepers, and the One that Watcheth (1870)
Love Dreaming by the Sea (1871)
King Solomon (c.1873), National Gallery of Art, Washington D.C., USA
The Head of Medusa (1884)
Erinna of Lesbos (1886)
The Virgin Knight (1887)
Night (1890)
Night and Her Child Asleep (1892)
Angel Boy (1895)
The Angel of Death (1895)
Hypnos, the god of sleep
The meeting of Dante and Beatrice 
Mercury
One Watching in the Night
Potens
A Prelude by Bach
Rabbi Carrying the Torah
Sleep
Twilight, Pity and Death 
Young Man holding Lord's Prayer
Youth Reciting Tales to Ladies

John Roddam Spencer Stanhope

Penelope (1849)
Sir Gawaine and the Damsels at the Fountain (1857)
Thoughts of the Past (1859)
Robin of Modern Times (1860)
Juliet and Her Nurse (1863)
The Wine Press (1864)
Our Lady of the Water Gate (1870)
Procris and Cephalus 
Love and the Maiden (1877)
Night (1878)
The Waters of Lethe by the Plains of Elysium (1879–80)
The Shulamite (c.1882)
[[Charon's obol#Art of the modern era|Charon and Psyche]] (c. 1883)
Why Seek Ye the Living Among the Dead? (c. 1886; also known as Resurrection)
Eve Tempted (1887)
The Pine Woods of Viareggio (1888)
Flora (1889)
Holy Trinity Main Altar Polyptych (1892–1894)
Holy Trinity Memorial Chapel Polyptych (1892–1894)
The Escape (c. 1900)

Other works (dates unavailable):
Andromeda
Autumn
Charcoal Thieves
Cupid and Psyche
In Memoriam
Love Betrayed (The Russell Cotes Gallery, Bournemouth)
The Millpond (watercolor with bodycolor)
Patience on a Monument Smiling at Grief
The Vision of Ezekiel: The Valley of Dry Bones
The Washing Place
The White Rabbit

Marie Spartali Stillman

John Melhuish Strudwick

John William Waterhouse

The Unwelcome Companion: A Street Scene in Cairo (1873), Towneley Hall Art Gallery, Burnley
Sleep and his Half-brother Death (1874), private collection
The Favourites of the Emperor Honorius (1883), Art Gallery of South Australia, Adelaide
Consulting the Oracle (1884), Tate, London
Saint Eulalia (1885), Tate, London
Esther Kenworthy Waterhouse (c. 1885), Sheffield City Art Galleries, Sheffield
The Magic Circle (1886), Tate, London
The Lady of Shalott (1888), Tate, London
Circe Offering the Cup to Ulysses (1891), Gallery Oldham, Oldham
Circe Invidiosa (1892), Art Gallery of South Australia, Adelaide
Hylas and the Nymphs (1896)
The Siren (c. 1900), private collection
The Crystal Ball (1902), private collection
Boreas (1903), private collection
Echo and Narcissus (1903), Walker Art Gallery, Liverpool
Danaïdes (1904), private collection
Jason and Medea (1907), private collection
Gather Ye Rosebuds While Ye May (1908), private collection
Gather Ye Rosebuds While Ye May (1909), Odon Wagner Gallery, Toronto
Circe (The Sorceress) (1911), private collection
I am Half-Sick of Shadows, said the Lady of Shalott (1916), Art Gallery of Ontario, Toronto
Dante and Beatrice (c.1915), Dahesh Museum, New York

Daniel Alexander Williamson

Cows Going Home (1859)
Spring (1859)
Morecambe Bay from Warton Crag (1862), Walker Art Gallery, Liverpool
Coniston Old Man from Warton Crag (1863), Walker Art Gallery, Liverpool
The Coot's Haunt, Broughton in Furness (1863–64)
A Grey Day (1865), Walker Art Gallery, Liverpool

William Lindsay Windus

The Black Boy (c.1844), Walker Art Gallery, Liverpool
Too Late (1858), Tate Britain, London
Study of a Dead Child, the Artist's Son (1860), Tate Britain, London
The Flight of Henry VI from Towton (c. 1860–1870), Tate Britain, London
The Outlaw (1861), Manchester Art Gallery
The Second Duchess (before 1866), Tate Britain, London
Mrs Teed, the Artist's Daughter (c.1880), Tate Britain, London
Samuel Teed (date unknown), Manchester Art Gallery
Burd Helen
The Stray Lamb

References

External links

Pre
Pre-Raphaelite paintings